Campsie Football Club was a Scottish association football club based in the village of Milton of Campsie, Stirlingshire.

History

The club was founded in 1883 and disbanded in 1894. The club competed in the Scottish Cup for nine seasons between 1883 and 1892 as well as the regional Stirlingshire Cup competition.  The club's best Cup run came in 1888–89, reaching the sixth round (last 8), losing to eventual winners Third Lanark.

Colours

The club's home colours were navy blue jerseys and knickers, with red socks, until 1891 when they changed to light blue.

References 

Defunct football clubs in Scotland
Association football clubs established in 1883
1883 establishments in Scotland
Association football clubs disestablished in 1894
1894 disestablishments in Scotland